Carl Paul Chebi (born 1965) is a United States Navy vice admiral who serves as the commander of Naval Air Systems Command since September 9, 2021. He most recently served as the Deputy Program Executive Officer of the F-35 Lightning II Joint Program Office from September 30, 2019 to September 9, 2021. Previously, he served as the Program Executive Officer for Command, Control, Communications, Computers, and Intelligence (C4I) and Space Systems of the Naval Information Warfare Systems Command from 2017 to 2019.

Raised in Holliston, Massachusetts, Chebi attended the Rensselaer Polytechnic Institute and earned a Bachelor of Science degree in computer systems engineering. He later graduated from flight school, Naval Test Pilot School and Navy Fighter Weapons School.

References

1965 births
Living people
Place of birth missing (living people)
People from Holliston, Massachusetts
Rensselaer Polytechnic Institute alumni
United States Naval Aviators
United States Naval Test Pilot School alumni
Recipients of the Meritorious Service Medal (United States)
Recipients of the Legion of Merit
United States Navy admirals
Recipients of the Navy Distinguished Service Medal
Military personnel from Massachusetts
United States Navy personnel of the Gulf War